KDHX (88.1 FM) is an independent, non-commercial, listener-supported community radio station in St. Louis, Missouri, United States offering a full spectrum of music along with cultural and public affairs programming since 1987.  KDHX broadcasts 24 hours a day online and with 42 kW of effective radiated power in stereo with RBDS data.

Station background
KDHX is licensed to the Double Helix Corporation, a 501(c)3 non-profit arts and educational organization with a mission to create community through media. The Double Helix Corporation was formed after the demise of KDNA, a countercultural community-radio station that operated in St. Louis's Gaslight Square district in the late 1960s and early 1970s. The corporation is independent of any governmental entity and is not affiliated with any religious or educational organization. The KDHX offices and studios are located at 3524 Washington Avenue in Grand Center; its tower is located in the northern part of Jefferson County.

Double Helix Corporation, operating under the name KDHX Community Media, is the licensee for 88.1 KDHX, which presents a primarily roots-based AAA (Adult Album Alternative) format interspersed with long-form public affairs programming one evening a week and short-form features throughout the broadcast schedule. The on-air DJs are all volunteers chosen by an elected program committee and trained by station staff.

In addition to its on-air activities, KDHX Community Media also produces a variety of music-oriented events such as Midwest Mayhem and Art Attack as well as collaborations with other community organizations. These collaborations include Harvest Sessions at the Tower Grove Farmers Market; Thursdays at the Intersection in Grand Center; the Sheldon Sessions with the Sheldon Concert Hall and SoundWaves with the Pulitzer Arts Foundation.

At the time of KDHX's founding, the frequency 88.1 MHz in the greater St. Louis area was occupied by 10-watt, Class D station KHRU-FM, operated by Clayton High School in Clayton, Missouri only from 5-8 p.m. Mon.-Fri. during the school year.  It was the only station in St. Louis operating on that frequency.  Double Helix tried to work out a cooperative arrangement with the Clayton School District to share the frequency, but the school district was unwilling to accept any frequency-sharing proposal.  Eventually Double Helix sued in federal court, resulting in a decision that stations had to "use it or lose it" with regard to frequencies.  After that decision, the Federal Communications Commission (FCC) revoked KHRU’s license and awarded the frequency to Double Helix Corporation.

See also
Grand Boulevard (St. Louis)
List of community radio stations in the United States

References

External links 
 Official KDHX website.
KDHX Collection Finding Aid at the St. Louis Public Library

 KDHX - Myspace.com page.
 STLradio.com, Contains many articles on the history of St. Louis radio broadcasting including one on the history of KDNA under "Call Letter History".  Originally from St. Louis Journalism Review.
 KDNA and KDHX archival materials and addendum at the Western Historical Manuscripts Collection.
 KDNA and KDHX archival materials at the Saint Louis Public Library.

DHX
DHX
Community radio stations in the United States
Radio stations established in 1976
1976 establishments in Missouri
Adult album alternative radio stations in the United States